Cooper Stephens is a professional Australian rules footballer who plays for  in the Australian Football League (AFL), having been drafted to the Geelong Football Club in 2019. He was traded to Hawthorn after the 2022 AFL season.

Early life
Stephens broke his leg at the start of his final underage year. Despite being disappointed he took the opportunity to train with the Geelong Falcons high performance manager and was in good shape for the combine testing at the end of the year.

He was drafted with the 16th selection in the 2019 AFL draft from Geelong Falcons in the NAB League.

AFL career 

Stephens had an interrupted start in the AFL, he was reduced to hub scratch matches in 2020 and in 2021 he suffered a ankle injury. He managed to string enough games in the VFL to be considered for a promotion to the senior side. He managed to play seven senior games in his debut season. 

Statistics 
Updated to the end of the 2022 season.

|-
| 2020 ||  || 12
| 0 || — || — || — || — || — || — || — || — || — || — || — || — || — || — || 0
|-
| 2021 ||  || 12
| 0 || — || — || — || — || — || — || — || — || — || — || — || — || — || — || 0
|-
| 2022 ||  || 12
| 7 || 0 || 0 || 36 || 40 || 76 || 14 || 11 || 0.0 || 0.0 || 5.1 || 5.7 || 10.8 || 2.0 || 1.5 || 0
|- class="sortbottom"
! colspan=3| Career
! 7 !! 0 !! 0 !! 36 !! 40 !! 76 !! 14 !! 11 !! 0.0 !! 0.0 !! 5.1 !! 5.7 !! 10.8 !! 2.0 !! 1.5 !! 0
|}

Notes

References

External links

Hawthorn Football Club players
Geelong Football Club players
Colac Football Club players
2001 births
Living people